{{DISPLAYTITLE:C6H13N}}
The molecular formula C6H13N (molar mass: 99.17 g/mol, exact mass: 99.1048 u) may refer to:

 Azepane, a heterocycle
 Cyclohexylamine, an amine derived from cyclohexane